Terence Longdon (14 May 1922 – 23 April 2011) was an English actor.

Biography
Born Hubert Tuelly Longdon in Newark-on-Trent, Nottinghamshire, England. During World War II, Longdon was a pilot with the Fleet Air Arm, protecting Atlantic convoys. While stationed at a naval base near Blackpool, he acted in a show and was seen by actor Douglas Hurn who encouraged him to pursue it.

After the war, Longdon trained at RADA (1946–48), and made his first stage appearance at the Lyceum, Sheffield in 1948, and his West End debut the same year. He was best known for his lead role in the 1950s–1960s British TV series Garry Halliday where he played a Biggles-like pilot who flew into various adventure situations. He was also known for his character actor roles in British television productions such as The Sandbaggers, Danger Man and The Avengers.

In film, he was Drusus, Messala's personal aide, in the film Ben-Hur. He had a major supporting role in the 1958 film Another Time, Another Place starring alongside Sean Connery and Lana Turner. He was also in four of the early Carry On films. He played occasional leading roles, most notably in the tense B-movie thriller Clash by Night (1963).

Terence Longdon lived on the border of Gloucestershire and Warwickshire. He died from cancer on 23 April 2011, aged 88.

Partial filmography

 Appointment with Venus (1951) - (uncredited)
 Angels One Five (1952) - Pimpernel Pilot
 Never Look Back (1952) - Alan Whitcomb
 Appointment in London (1952) - Dr.Buchanan
 Forbidden Cargo (1954) - A.P.O. at Customs Launch (uncredited)
 Mr. Arkadin (1955) - Secretary
 The Woman for Joe (1955) - Doctor at the Circus (uncredited)
 Simon and Laura (1955) - Barney
 Helen of Troy (1956) - Patroclus
 Jumping for Joy (1956) - John Wyndham
 The Man Who Never Was (1956) - Larry
 Doctor at Large (1957) - George - House Surgeon
 Dangerous Exile (1957) - Col. Sir Frederick Venner
 The Silent Enemy (1958) - Lieutenant Bailey
 Another Time, Another Place (1958) - Alan Thompson
 Carry On Sergeant (1958) - Miles Haywood
 Carry On Nurse (1959) - Ted York
 Ben-Hur (1959) - Drusus
 Carry On Constable (1960) - Herbert Hall
 Carry On Regardless (1961) - Montgomery Infield-Hopping
 Out of the Shadow (1961) - Mark Kingston 
 On the Fiddle (1961) - Air Gunner
 What a Whopper (1961) - Vernon
 Clash by Night (1963) - Martin Lord
 The Return of Mr. Moto (1965) - Jonathan Westering
 The Wild Geese (1978) - Anonymous Man
 The Martian Chronicles (1979, TV Mini-Series) - Martian Elder
 The Sea Wolves (1980) - Malverne
 Hitler: The Rise of Evil (2003, TV Mini-Series) - Baron No. 1 (final appearance)

References

External links 
 
 
 Obituary - The Stage
 Obituary - The Guardian
 Obituary - The Independent
 Obituary - The Telegraph

1922 births
2011 deaths
English male stage actors
English male film actors
English male television actors
People from Newark-on-Trent
Male actors from Nottinghamshire
Alumni of RADA